Markas Beneta (born 8 July 1993) is a Lithuanian professional footballer who plays for FK Panevėžys and the Lithuanian national team.

Professional career
He started his professional career at FC Klaipėda. Later removed to FK Žalgiris.

FK Panevėžys 
On 4 January 2023 he signed with Panevėžys Club.

References

External links
 
 at alyga.lt
 Globalsportsarchive
 lietuvosfutbolas.lt

1993 births
Living people
Lithuanian footballers
Lithuanian expatriate footballers
Lithuania international footballers
Association football defenders
FK Žalgiris players
FK Atlantas players
FK Kauno Žalgiris players
JK Narva Trans players
Zagłębie Sosnowiec players
Meistriliiga players
A Lyga players
I liga players
Expatriate footballers in Estonia
Expatriate footballers in Poland
Lithuanian expatriate sportspeople in Estonia
Lithuanian expatriate sportspeople in Poland